Anthony "Anto" Drennan (born on 1 November 1958) is an English-born Irish guitarist noted for his involvement with the Corrs, Genesis and Mike + the Mechanics among others.

Drennan is from a musical Irish family and was born in Luton, England; he and his family moved back to Ireland while he was at a young age. He grew up in County Dublin and attended Kilmacud National School.

Drennan became a touring lead guitarist for the Corrs from late 1995 and onwards. He was chosen as the touring second guitarist/bassist for Genesis on their 1998 Calling All Stations tour (replacing long-time live band member Daryl Stuermer). In 2010 he was hired as a member of the revived Mike + the Mechanics. He has also played with Clannad, Paul Brady, Moving Hearts, Chris Rea, Davy Spillane, the Liffey Light Orchestra, the Ronnie Drew Band and other well-known Irish bands and performers.

Discography 

 1985 : Clannad : Macalla 
 1986 : Zerra One : The Domino Effect 
 1988 : Davy Spillane Band : Out in the air
 1989 : Stano : Only - Plays on 2 songs 
 1989 : Terence Trent D'Arby : Neither Fish Nor Flesh: A Soundtrack Of Love, Faith, Hope And Destruction
 1989 : Clannad : Past Present - Plays on In a lifetime with Mel Collins & Bono from U2 
 1990 : Clannad : Anam 
 1990 : Republic Of Ireland Football Squad : Put'em Under Pressure - Maxi single 
 1990 : Davy Spillane : Shadow Hunter 
 1991 : Chris Rea : Auberge
 1991 : Davy Spillane : Pipedreams
 1992 : Andy Irvine & Davy Spillane : East Wind 
 1993 : Clannad : Banba 
 1994 : Máire Brennan : Misty eyed adventure 
 1994 : Paul Harrington & Charlie McGettigan : Rock 'N' Roll Kids - Anthony plays electric guitar & bass 
 1995 : Paul Brady : Spirits Colliding - Plays on 1 song 
 1995 : Various Artists : Celtic Christmas - Plays acoustic guitar on 1 song 
 1995 : Ronnie Drew : Dirty Rotten Shame - Plays electric, acoustic & Spanish guitars 
 1995 : Clannad : Lore 
 1997 : Ronan Hardiman : Solas - Plays Nylon Guitar on 1 song
 1997 : Bill Whelan : The Roots Of Riverdance - Plays on 2 songs
 1997 : The Corrs : Talk On Corners - Plays on 3 songs 
 1997 : The Corrs : Live
 1997 : The Corrs : Closer - Plays on 2 songs 
 1997 : Clannad : Landmarks - Plays on 7 songs, also with Mel Collins 
 1998 : Máire Brennan : Perfect time 
 1998 : Various Artists : Med Et Z Præsenterer [Radiohitz] - Live & Unplugged - Plays on Congo by Genesis 
 1998 : Kieran Goss : Worse Than Pride - Plays on 3 songs 
 1999 : The Corrs : Unplugged 
 1999 : Máire Brennan : Whisper To The Wild Water 
 1999 : Daniel O'Donnell : Greatest Hits 
 2000 : The Corrs : In Blue 
 2000 : The Corrs : Live At Lansdowne Road
 2001 : The Corrs : Live in London 
 2001 : Five : Kingsize - Plays on 1 song
 2002 : The Corrs : VH1 Presents The Corrs Live In Dublin - With Ron Wood & Bono
 2002 : Will Young : From Now On - Plays on 2 songs 
 2002 : Blazin' Squad : In The Beginning: Special Edition
 2002 : Clannad : A Magical Gathering - The Clannad Anthology - Plays on 9 songs 
 2003 : Moya Brennan : Two Horizons 
 2003 : The Idols : The XMas Factor - Plays on 1 song 
 2004 : The Corrs : Borrowed Heaven - Additional guitar on 1 song 
 2004 : John Hughes : Wild Ocean - With The Corrs & The Chieftains 
 2004 : Gabrielle : Play to win - Plays on 5 songs, also Dylan Howe on drums
 2005 : The Corrs : Home - Plays on 10 songs
 2005 : Moya Brennan : An Irish Christmas 
 2006 : The Corrs : Dreams (The Ultimate Corrs Collection) - Featuring Bono, The Chieftains, Laurent Voulzy & Ron Wood 
 2006 : Various Artists :  Rogue's Gallery (Pirate Ballads, Sea Songs, & Chanteys) - Plays on 2 songs 
 2007 : Eivør : Mannabarn - Plays on 6 songs 
 2007 : Genesis : 1983 - 1998 - Plays on 3 songs 
 2007 : Moving Hearts : Live in Dublin 
 2009 : Genesis : Live in Poland - 2 CD
 2010 : Sharon Corr : Dream of you 
2011 : Liffey Light Orchestra : Filaments
 2011 : Gavin Friday : Catholic - Plays on 8 songs 
 2011 : Mike + The Mechanics: The Road 
 2014 : Mike + The Mechanics : The Singles 1985 - 2014 
 2014 : Sharon Corr : The Same Sun - Plays classical guitar on 1 song 
 2015 : The Corrs : White light - Plays on 1 song
2017 : Liffey Light Orchestra : Le French Album
 2017 : Mike + The Mechanics : Let Me Fly
 2017 : The Corrs: Jupiter Calling
 2019 : Mike + The Mechanics: Out of the Blue
2020 : Liffey Light Orchestra: Lekeila

Filmography 

 1999 : The Corrs: Les live de Solidays 
 2000 : Unplugged - Various Artists
 2000 : The Corrs at Christmas
 2000 : The Corrs: Live at Lansdowne Road
 2002 : The Corrs Live in Dublin 
 2005 : The Corrs Live in Geneva 
 Moving Hearts Live in Dublin (Recorded 2007, released 2008)
 2009 : Genesis Live in Poland - 2 DVD 
 2011 : Living with the tiger - Documentary Music by John Califra & Anthony Drennan

References

Other references 
 Discography : https://www.discogs.com/fr/artist/271365-Anthony-Drennan?page=1
 Filmography : https://www.imdb.com/name/nm0237466/
 Genesis Live in Poland DVD : https://www.discogs.com/Genesis-Live-In-Poland/release/4989667

1958 births
Living people
Genesis (band) members
Mike + The Mechanics members
The Corrs
Irish rock guitarists
Moving Hearts members